Nuclear ubiquitous casein and cyclin-dependent kinases substrate is a protein that in humans is encoded by the NUCKS1 gene.

References

Further reading